Dolna Bela Rechka is a village in Varshets Municipality, Montana Province, northwestern Bulgaria.

References

Villages in Montana Province